Thao Dien Station (Vietnamese: Ga Thảo Điền) is a future elevated Ho Chi Minh City Metro station on Line 1. Located in Thao Dien Ward, Thu Duc City, the station is planned to open in 2024.

References

Ho Chi Minh City Metro stations
Proposed buildings and structures in Vietnam
Railway stations scheduled to open in 2024